Andrea Della Valle is an Italian businessman and billionaire.  He was the co-owner of the ACF Fiorentina (for 1% shares), serving as its chairman until 2009.

He is the vice-chairman of the Tod's Group, of which his brother Diego Della Valle is chairman.

References

Living people
Italian billionaires
Italian football chairmen and investors
ACF Fiorentina chairmen and investors
Year of birth missing (living people)
Della Valle family